Afzalabad may refer to:
 Afzalabad, Corrin, Sistan and Baluchestan Province
 Afzalabad, Iranshahr, Sistan and Baluchestan Province
 Afzalabad, Birjand, South Khorasan Province
 Afzalabad, Shusef, Nehbandan County, South Khorasan Province
 Nowghab-e Afzalabad, South Khorasan Province